Wargnies-le-Grand is a commune in the Nord department in northern France.

Heraldry

Population

See also
Communes of the Nord department

References

Wargnieslegrand